The Bolivia women's national under-20 football team represents Bolivia in international women's football at age of 20 and is controlled by the Federación Boliviana de Fútbol. The team competes South American U-20 Women's Championship. Bolivia has never qualified for a FIFA U-20 Women's World Cup.

Team image

Nicknames
The Bolivia women's national under-20 football team has been known or nicknamed as the "".

Home stadium
Bolivia plays their home matches on the Estadio Hernando Siles and others stadiums.

History
The Bolivia women's national under-20 team have meet against Uruguay in their debut game on 11 May 2004 at Sucre, Chile which Chile won by 9–1 goals. The team have participated all the edition of South American Under-20 Women's Football Championship. The girls was finished tournament two times in Fourth-Place 2004, 2014.

Current squad
The following players list were announced for 2022 South American Under-20 Women's Football Championship

Fixtures and results
Legend

2020

2022

Competitive records
 Champions   Runners-up   Third place   Fourth place

FIFA U-20 Women's World Cup

South American Under-20 Women's Football Championship

References

South American women's national under-20 association football teams